Psyllinae is a subfamily of plant-parasitic hemipterans in the family Psyllidae. There are about 12 genera and at least 40 described species in Psyllinae.

Genera
These 12 genera belong to the subfamily Psyllinae:

 Amorphicola Heslop-Harrison, 1961 c g b
 Arytaina Förster, 1848 c g b
 Arytainilla Loginova, 1972 c g b
 Cacopsylla Ossiannilsson, 1970 c g b
 Ceanothia Heslop-Harrison, 1961 c g b
 Euglyptoneura Heslop-Harrison, 1961 c g b
 Nyctiphalerus Bliven, 1955 c g b
 Pexopsylla Jensen, 1957 c g b
 Platycorypha Tuthill, 1945 c g b
 Psylla Geoffroy, 1762 c g b
 Purshivora Heslop-Harrison, 1961 c g b
 Spanioneura Foerster, 1848 c g b

Data sources: i = ITIS, c = Catalogue of Life, g = GBIF, b = Bugguide.net

References

Further reading

External links

 

Psyllidae